Durham Athletic Park, nicknamed "The DAP", is a former minor league baseball stadium in Durham, North Carolina. The stadium was home to the Durham Bulls from 1926 through 1994, and is currently home to the North Carolina Central Eagles and the Durham School of the Arts Bulldogs. The DAP sits north of the downtown area of Durham, on the block bounded by Washington, Corporation, Foster and Geer Streets.

Durham Athletic Park became one of the most famous minor league ballparks in history thanks to the 1988 film Bull Durham, featuring the Bulls, Kevin Costner, Tim Robbins and Susan Sarandon. Most of the filming was done at the DAP, following the end of the Carolina League season of 1987. The film's wide acclaim helped fuel the burgeoning public interest in minor league ball in general. In the case of both the city and the film, this explosion of popularity caused the DAP to become a victim of its own success; despite expansion with temporary bleachers, it became too small to handle the increase in crowd size and the Bulls’ Triple-A ambitions.

The Bulls moved to their new home Durham Bulls Athletic Park (also known as "DBAP") in downtown Durham, starting with the 1995 season. The ballpark was built with a capacity to Carolina League standards, but the land that the DBAP was built on had more room in case the ballpark needed to be expanded for Triple-A baseball. Triple-A baseball came to Durham in 1998 and the Bulls moved up from High-A to Triple-A, with DBAP then expanded to Triple-A standards.

El Toro Park

Before El Toro
In their early days, the Durham Bulls played at Trinity College's Hanes Field,—named for the founder of the clothing company, a Trinity graduate—now called Williams Field and still used for field hockey on Duke's east campus.

From 1913 until early summer 1926 the Bulls played their games at Doherty Park in what was then called East Durham.

A place to call their own
On July 7, 1926, the Bulls moved to a new field called El Toro Park, built atop the streambed of Ellerbe Creek, which was re-routed, underground, through a tunnel beneath the pitcher's mound. The ballpark, originally built with a wooden grandstand, was dedicated by the Commissioner of Baseball, Kenesaw Mountain Landis, on July 26, 1926, who rode a live bull—the team mascot—onto the playing field. In 1932, the Bulls became a farm team for the Philadelphia Phillies, becoming part of the Yankees organization a year later. The facility was renamed Durham Athletic Park during the 1933 offseason, following a $20,000 donation by Annie Watts Hill and her husband, John Sprunt Hill, that enabled the City of Durham to purchase the park.

The Depression and disaster

The Bulls sat out the 1934 and 1935 seasons, owing to the Great Depression. For 1936, Cincinnati Reds moved their affiliation (Piedmont League squad) from the Wilmington Pirates to Durham, re-activating the Durham Bulls franchise. On the evening of June 17, 1939,  the wooden Durham Athletic Park was destroyed by a fire that followed a 7–3 win over the Portsmouth Cubs, causing more than $100,000 in damage and nearly killing groundskeeper Walter Williams, who was asleep under the grandstand when the blaze began, shortly after midnight.

The current stadium 
Less than two weeks after the disastrous fire that completely destroyed the stadium, a new concrete and steel grandstand, seating 1,000 spectators, opened on July 2, 1939, in time for the Bulls to face the Charlotte Hornets, as a result, 1939 is the year from which the current DAP is normally dated.

During the off-season of 1939–1940 the stadium was rebuilt on-site, with 2,000 grandstand seats and portable bleachers along the 1st and 3rd base lines. Funding for the completely new stadium was provided by John Sprunt Hill and the design was penned by Durham architect George Watts Carr, who added the park's distinctive conical ticket tower. The new DAP reopened April 7, 1940, for an exhibition game between the Cincinnati Reds and the Boston Red Sox, with the Bulls, now part of the Dodgers, playing their first game in the new DAP on April 17, before a crowd of 1,587.

Postwar decline
The Bulls were re-activated in early 1945, as the Red Sox's Class-C team in the newly established Carolina League, after sitting out for the 1944 season which was a year-long drought of baseball at the DAP, due to the second World War. Following a realignment to become part of the Detroit Tigers club in 1948, the DAP witnessed an important moment in the civil rights movement, when on August 10, 1951, Percy Miller, Jr., the first black player in the Carolina League made his minor league debut with the visiting Danville Leafs.

Attention to baseball waned in the Bull City, through the 1960s, even after the Bulls became the farm club for the Houston Colt .45s expansion team. Attendance numbers were down throughout the region, so much that after the 1967 season, the Bulls acquired a Raleigh baseball team from the nearby city of Raleigh, North Carolina and so the Raleigh club merged into the Durham Bulls, renaming the Durham Bulls the Raleigh-Durham Mets, splitting the season between the DAP and Raleigh's Devereaux Meadow. There is no record on if this Raleigh team is a new team or the Raleigh Pirates. The team became the Raleigh-Durham Phillies in 1969 and then the Triangles in 1970, eventually disbanding again after the 1971 season, leaving the stalwart Durham Athletic Park virtually without purpose.

Reborn again
As for the Durham Bulls, they came and went over the years in various iterations, par for the course for minor league teams at the time. In 1980, the Bulls were revived as a farm team for the Atlanta Braves by new owner Miles Wolff. Baseball returned to the DAP for the first time in 9 years on April 15, 1980, before a crowd of 4,418. The park was repainted in the bright blue and orange team colors. Over the interior entrance was a sign reading El Toro Stadium, a variation of its original name. The team had a successful year, leading the Carolina League in attendance that first season with 175,963 and nearly 30% of the league total of 600,809. This was also well ahead of second-place Salem which drew 102,456.

Bull Durham and beyond
The team's popularity received a large boost when the ballpark became the primary setting for the film Bull Durham, which also contributed to the end of the DAP as an important baseball venue. Increased attendance at the DAP, with frequent capacity crowds, and an interest in attracting a Triple-A franchise prompted the city to build a new ballpark on the other side of the downtown, adjacent to the former American Tobacco campus. 1993 was promoted as the final season for the DAP, but construction delays compelled the team to play one more season there. In 1994, the club sold T-shirts bearing the legend "2nd Annual Final Season at the DAP". On September 5, 1994, the Bulls played their final game at the DAP, a 6–2 loss to the Winston-Salem Spirits in Game 1 of the Carolina League's South Division playoffs.

In 1995, the Bulls abandoned their home since 1926 and moved to the new Durham Bulls Athletic Park or "D-BAP". Attendance continued to be so good that the Bulls were promoted to the AAA level 3 years later, when Major League Baseball's most recent round of expansion required the addition of two new AAA teams. Despite the relatively small size of the city, they continue to hold their own in attendance figures among the larger member cities of the International League.

The DAP after the Durham Bulls 

Following the Bulls departure in September 1994, the DAP was still used for events such as concerts, the Bull Durham Blues Festival, the World Beer Festival and softball tournaments, and was the regular home field of the (now defunct) Durham Americans (formerly Durham Braves) of the Coastal Plain League, an NCAA-sanctioned collegiate summer league.

The Durham Dragons of the Women's Professional Softball League (forerunner to the current National Pro Fastpitch League) also made the park its home.

From 1998 to 2004, the Durham Athletic Park's main parking lot was home to the Durham Farmers' Market on Saturday mornings during the Winter.

In the summer of 2005 rumors of baseball being played at the DAP surfaced again.  Nearby North Carolina Central University announced plans to expand its athletic department to include baseball and identified the DAP as the venue for its home stadium.

2008–2009 renovation
In 2008, the City of Durham allocated over $4 million in general obligation bond funds to renovate the DAP; Baltimore developer Struever Bros. Eccles and Rouse was tasked with renovating the historic facility, in the hopes that it will be operated by Minor League Baseball as a training facility for umpires, groundskeepers, and other crew. The DAP will be used for NCCU games and other athletic programming along with concerts, festivals and other events. MiLB is also considering building a Minor League Baseball "fan experience museum" with public-sector support; the buildings at the northeast corner of the ballpark are of the greatest interest for this significant tourist attraction. In early 2008, the City of Durham pledged an additional $1 million to the renovation, the money coming from interest earned on unspent bond funds. A ground-breaking ceremony was held on April 30, with reconstruction beginning in late July 2008.

The stadium re-opened on August 15, 2009, concluding the renovation with a picnic featuring former Bulls players and local celebrities.

The Bulls return to the DAP
On the evening of May 10, 2010, before a crowd of 3,911, the-now Class AAA Durham Bulls returned to The DAP for a single regular-season game against the Toledo Mud Hens. With additional lighting on-hand to raise the field to Triple-A standards, the Bulls fell to the Mud Hens 6–4, mirroring the score of the Single-A club's final game in the stadium 16 years prior.

Among other events scheduled for 2011 was another return to the DAP by the Bulls, again on the second Monday night in May. The game was played on May 9 and resulted in a loss to the Indianapolis Indians.

MiLB Departs the DAP
On September 2, 2011, Minor League Baseball announced that it would not renew its contract to manage the DAP.  The Durham Bulls announced on December 27, 2011, that they will be assuming the operating agreement from Minor League Baseball.

Dimensions
During its final years as a regular minor league ballpark:
Left Field – 
Left Center Field – 
Center Field – 
Center Field Corner, outer wall – 
Deep Right Center Field – 
Right Center Field – not posted
Right Field – 

Gallery

References

External links
 Ballpark Digest Visit to Durham Athletic Park
 Durham Bulls team history
 Durham Athletic Park Views - Ball Parks of the Minor Leagues

Defunct baseball venues in the United States
Sports venues in Durham, North Carolina
Baseball venues in North Carolina
1926 establishments in North Carolina
Sports venues completed in 1926
Minor league baseball venues
Negro league baseball venues still standing
College baseball venues in the United States